Raúl Sánchez is the name of:
Raúl Sánchez (musician) (born 1973), Spanish-born Australian rock musician
Raúl Sánchez (baseball) (1930–2002), Cuban MLB player
Raúl Sánchez (footballer, born 1933) (1933–2016), full name Raúl Pedro Sánchez Soya, Chilean footballer
Raúl Sánchez (footballer, born 1976), full name Raúl Sánchez Soler, Chilean footballer
Raúl Sánchez (footballer, born 1997), full name Raúl Sánchez Sánchez, Spanish footballer